Pathio railway station is a railway station in Thale Sap Sub-district, Pathio District, Chumphon, Thailand.

Train services 
 Special Express No. 43/44 Bangkok-Surat Thani-Bangkok
 Special Express No. 39/40 Bangkok-Surat Thani-Bangkok
 Special Express No. 41/42 Bangkok-Yala-Bangkok
 Express No. 86 Nakhon Si Thammarat-Bangkok
 Rapid No. 167/168 Bangkok-Kantang-Bangkok
 Rapid No. 169/170 Bangkok-Yala-Bangkok
 Rapid No. 174 Nakhon Si Thammarat-Bangkok
 Rapid No. 177/178 Thon Buri-Lang Suan-Thon Buri
 Ordinary No. 254/255 Lang Suan-Thon Buri-Lang Suan

References 
 
 

Railway stations in Thailand